Joseph Wilkinson may refer to:

Joseph Biddle Wilkinson Jr.
Joseph Wilkinson, member of Laura (band)

See also
Joe Wilkinson (disambiguation)